Prickle planar cell polarity protein 1 is a protein that in humans is encoded by the PRICKLE1 gene.

Function

This gene encodes a nuclear receptor that may be a negative regulator of the Wnt/beta-catenin signaling pathway. The encoded protein localizes to the nuclear membrane and has been implicated in the nuclear trafficking of the transcription repressors REST/NRSF and REST4. Mutations in this gene have been linked to progressive myoclonus epilepsy. Alternate splicing results in multiple transcript variants. A pseudogene of this gene is found on chromosome 3.

References

Further reading